Ortognathosia is a genus of moths belonging to the family Tortricidae.

Species
Ortognathosia santamariana Razowski, 1988

See also
List of Tortricidae genera

References

 , 2005: World catalogue of insects volume 5 Tortricidae.
  1988: Acta zool. cracov. 31: 391.

External links
tortricidae.com

Euliini
Tortricidae genera